Gleb Pavlovich Glebov (real surname Sorokin; Belarusian: Глеб Паўлавіч Глебаў; May 11, 1899 – March 3, 1967) was a Soviet and Belarusian theater and film actor. People's Artist of the USSR (1948).

Biography 
Glebov was born on April 29 (May 11; NS), 1899 in Voznesensk (now Nikolaev region of Ukraine) (according to other sources, in Voskresensk, now Moscow region) in the family of a railway employee, who was an aspiring actor.

In 1920, he graduated from the Bendera men's gymnasium. From 1920 to 1921, he studied at the Odessa Polytechnic Institute.

From 1921 to 1923, Glebov was an actor of the Odessa Russian Drama Group (now the Odessa Academic Russian Drama Theater); from 1924 to 1925, the Nikolaev Theater of Russian Drama (now the Nikolaev Academic Artistic Russian Drama Theater); from 1925 to 1926, the Voznesensk Russian Drama Theater.

From 1926, Glebov was an actor of the 1st Belarusian Drama Theater (now the Yanka Kupala National Academic Theater), and between 1941 and 1947, he was an artistic director.

In 1943, Glebov led the theater's front-line brigade.

Glebov was a Deputy of the Supreme Soviet of the USSR of the 6th convocation (1962-1966).

Gleb Glebov died on March 3, 1967, in Minsk, Belarus.

Theater 

 1932 — "Batkovshchina" by Chorny as Nemir
 1937 — "The Miser" by Moliere as Harpagon
 1938 — "Partisans" by  Nettle as Halimon
 1939 — "The Death of the Wolf" by  Samuylenok as  Kharkevich
 1939 — "Who Laughs Last" by Nettle as  Tulyaga
 1944 — "Paulinka" by  Yanka Kupala as Pustarevich
 1947 — "Konstantin Zaslonov" by  Movzon as Kroplia
 1950 — "Kalinovaya Roscha" by  Korneichuk as  Romanyuk
 1954 — "Excuse Me, Please" by Makajonak  as  Peas
 1959 — "So That People Do Not Scold" by Makajonak as  Samoseev
 1959 — "Day of Wonderful Deceptions" by R.B. Sheridan as  Mendoza

Awards and Titles 
 People's Artist of the Byelorussian SSR (1940)
 People's Artist of the USSR (1948)
 Stalin Prize of the second degree (1941) for great achievements in the field of theatrical and dramatic art
 Stalin Prize of the second degree (1948)   for the performance of the role of Kropli in the play "Konstantin Zaslonov" by A. Movzon
 Two Orders of Lenin (1940, 1955)
 Two Orders of the Red Banner of Labour (1944, 1948)
 Medal "For Valiant Labour in the Great Patriotic War 1941–1945" (1945)

Family
Father, Pavel Sorokin, railway employee; aspiring actor
Wife, Nadezhda Sorokina, actress 
Granddaughter, Zoya Belakhvostik, actress 
Son-in-law, Valentin Belakhvostik, actor

References

Bibliography 
 Дуніна С., Г. П. Глебов. — М.; Л., 1949
 Стэльмах У. М., Народны артыст СССР Г. П. Глебаў. — Мн., 1954
 Красінскі А. В., Беларускія акцёры ў кіно. — Мн., 1973

External links 

 
 Біяграфія на сайце kino-teatr.ru 

1899 births
1967 deaths
Odesa National Polytechnic University alumni
Sixth convocation members of the Supreme Soviet of the Soviet Union
Pseudonymous artists
People's Artists of Belarus
People's Artists of the USSR
Stalin Prize winners
Recipients of the Order of Lenin
Recipients of the Order of the Red Banner of Labour
Belarusian male actors
Belarusian male film actors
Belarusian male stage actors
Soviet male actors
Soviet male film actors
Soviet male stage actors